Sayed Mohamed Yusuf (1895 – 8 December 1979) was an Indian field hockey player who competed in the 1928 Summer Olympics.

He was a member of the Indian field hockey team, which won the gold medal. He played four matches as halfback.

External links
 
 profile

1895 births
1979 deaths
Olympic field hockey players of India
Field hockey players at the 1928 Summer Olympics
Indian male field hockey players
Indian Muslims
Olympic gold medalists for India
Olympic medalists in field hockey
Medalists at the 1928 Summer Olympics
Indian emigrants to Pakistan